The Devil's Agent is a 1962 drama film directed by John Paddy Carstairs and starring Peter van Eyck, Marianne Koch, Christopher Lee and Macdonald Carey. It was a co-production between Britain, West Germany and the Republic of Ireland. It was based on a 1956 novel by Hans Habe. It is set in East Germany during the Cold War.

Plot
Mild-mannered Viennese wine merchant George Droste (Peter van Eyck), an intelligence expert during the Second World War, unexpectedly encounters old friend Baron Von Staub (Christopher Lee), and spends a weekend with him on his estate in the Soviet zone. The two revive a friendship interrupted by the war. However, when Von Straub's sister asks Droste to transport a small package to a friend in West Germany, the bewildered Droste is set up for a series of complicated spy games, at first becoming an unwilling dupe for the Soviet Union, and then retaliating by offering his services to a US intelligence agency.

Partial cast
 Peter van Eyck as Droste
 Marianne Koch as  Nora
 Christopher Lee as Baron von Staub
 Macdonald Carey as Mr Smith
 Albert Lieven as Inspector Huebring
 Billie Whitelaw as  Piroska
 David Knight as Father Zambory
 Marius Goring as General Greenhahn
 Helen Cherry as Countess Cosimano
 Colin Gordon as Count Dezsepalvy
 Niall MacGinnis as Paul Vass
 Eric Pohlmann as Bloch
 Peter Vaughan as Chief of Hungarian Police
 Michael Brennan as Horvat
 Jeremy Bulloch as Johnny Droste

Critical reception
TV Guide gave it two out of four stars, noting an "Occasionally gripping spy drama with a very good cast." while Allmovie concluded, "Somewhat lost amidst the flashier James Bond clones of the late 1960s, The Devil's Agent holds up pretty well when seen today."

References

External links

1962 films
1960s spy drama films
British spy drama films
Irish drama films
West German films
English-language German films
English-language Irish films
Films directed by John Paddy Carstairs
Films set in Germany
Cold War spy films
Films based on Austrian novels
Films shot in Ireland
British black-and-white films
1962 drama films
Films set in East Germany
1960s English-language films
1960s British films